David Joseph Tomassoni (December 5, 1952 – August 11, 2022) was an American politician who served in the Minnesota Legislature from 1993 to 2022. A former member of the Minnesota Democratic–Farmer–Labor Party (DFL), Tomassoni left the party to become independent in November 2020 and joined the Minnesota Senate Republican Caucus.

Tomassoni chaired the Senate Economic Development Committee from 2007 to 2010. He then chaired the Environment, Economic Development and Agriculture Finance Division, co-chaired the Legislative-Citizen Commission on Minnesota Resources (LCCMR), and chaired the Iron Range Resources & Rehabilitation Board (IRRRB) four times. Tomassoni was also vice chair of the Minnesota Amateur Sports Commission.

Early life, education, and career
Tomassoni was born in Bemidji, Minnesota. He graduated from Chisholm High School in Chisholm, Minnesota and received a BSBA from the University of Denver. Tomassoni played professional hockey in Italy for 16 years and for the Italian national team at the 1984 Winter Olympics.

Minnesota House of Representatives
Tomassoni represented District 5B in the Minnesota House of Representatives from 1993 to 2001. He served as an assistant majority leader from 1997 to 2001.

Minnesota Senate
Tomassoni was elected to the Senate in 2000 and reelected in 2002, 2006, 2010, 2012, 2016, and 2020. He was a majority whip from 2001 to 2007.

President of the Minnesota Senate

Tomassoni was elected president of the Minnesota Senate on November 12, 2020, in a rare event where the Senate's Republican majority supported a member of the DFL for Senate president. The move was seen as strategic, given that the slim Republican majority in the Senate could be lost if the Senate president became lieutenant governor. That happened in 2018, when Senate President Michelle Fischbach became lieutenant governor after Tina Smith was appointed to the U.S. Senate.

Three weeks after the 2020 elections, when it was determined that the DFL had not won a Senate majority, Tomassoni and Senator Thomas Bakk announced they had left the DFL to form their own "Independent Caucus." Republican Majority Leader Paul Gazelka welcomed the move and made Tomassoni chair of the Higher Education Finance and Policy Committee in exchange for voting with Republicans on floor votes. This changed the Senate's composition to 34 Republicans, 31 Democrats, and two independents.

Electoral history

Personal life and death
Tomassoni and his wife, Charlotte, have three children and lived in Chisholm, Minnesota. He was involved in the insurance business. In July 2021, Tomassoni announced he had been diagnosed with amyotrophic lateral sclerosis.

Tomassoni died of ALS at a hospice in Duluth, Minnesota, on August 11, 2022.

References

External links

Senator David Tomassoni official Minnesota Senate website
Minnesota Public Radio Votetracker: Senator Dave Tomassoni
Senator David Tomassoni official campaign website

|-

|-

1952 births
2022 deaths
21st-century American politicians
American athlete-politicians
American people of Italian descent
Businesspeople from Minnesota
Deaths from motor neuron disease 
Denver Pioneers men's ice hockey players
HC Gardena players
HC Merano players
HC Milano players
HC Varese players
Ice hockey players from Minnesota
Ice hockey players at the 1984 Winter Olympics
American expatriate ice hockey players in Italy
Members of the Minnesota House of Representatives
Minnesota Democrats
Minnesota Independents
Minnesota state senators
Neurological disease deaths in Minnesota
New Haven Nighthawks players
Olympic ice hockey players of Italy
People from Bemidji, Minnesota
People from Chisholm, Minnesota
Presidents of the Minnesota Senate
Ritten Sport players
Naturalised citizens of Italy
American ice hockey defensemen
Italian ice hockey defencemen